Wick Town Hall is a municipal building in Bridge Street, Wick, in the Highland area of Scotland. The structure, which is used as a community events venue, is a Category B listed building.

History
The first municipal building in Wick was a tolbooth which was erected on the north side of the High Street in 1750. It accommodated prison cells on the ground floor and a courtroom above. By the early 19th century, the building had become dilapidated, and the burgh leaders decided to replace it. The site they selected for the new building was on the east side of Bridge Street, a short distance from the Bridge of Wick. It was designed by Robert Reid in the neoclassical style, built in coursed rubble masonry and was completed in 1828.

The design involved a symmetrical main frontage with three bays facing onto Bridge Street. The central bay, which slightly projected forward, was formed by a five-stage tower with the central opening of an arcade in the first stage, a sash window in the second stage, a blind panel in the third stage, an octagonal section with alternating clock faces and blind panels in the fourth stage and a circular cupola with a dome and a weather vane in the fifth stage. The outer bays were formed by single-storey structures, which were surmounted by balustraded parapets and which contained the outer openings of the arcade; behind the single-storey sections was the main courthouse block which was fenestrated by sash windows. Internally, the principal room was the courtroom on the first floor.

Petty session hearings, which had previously been held at Thurso, were then relocated to the new courtroom. After a new sheriff courthouse was erected on an adjacent site just to the north in 1866, the town hall was primarily used as a meeting place for the burgh council. The building continued to serve in that capacity for much of the 20th century, but ceased to be the local seat of government when the enlarged Caithness District Council was formed at the council offices in Market Square in 1975. However, the building continued to serve as a community events venue, and a major programme of refurbishment works, involving the installation of a new lift and a new heating system, was carried out in 2012.

Works of art in the town hall include a portrait by Henry Raeburn of the naturalist, Alexander Macleay, a portrait by Benjamin West of the statistician, Sir John Sinclair, and a portrait by Hubert von Herkomer of the local member of parliament, Sir John Pender. There is also a portrait of David Macbeth Sutherland of General Lord Horne and a portrait by unnamed artist of the naval architect, James Bremner.

See also
 List of listed buildings in Wick, Highland

References

Government buildings completed in 1828
City chambers and town halls in Scotland
Category B listed buildings in Highland (council area)
Wick, Caithness
Government buildings with domes
Clock towers in the United Kingdom